The 2006 Medibank International Women's Hardcourts was a tennis tournament played on outdoor hard courts. It was the 28th edition of the event then known as the 2006 Medibank International Women's Hardcourts, and was a Tier II event on the 2006 WTA Tour. It took place in Sydney, Cumberland, Australia, from 9 January through 13 January 2006.

The 2006 Medibank International was a tennis tournament played on outdoor hard courts. It was the 114th edition of the event known that year as the Medibank International, and was part of the International Series of the 2006 ATP Tour, and of the Tier II Series of the 2006 WTA Tour. Both the men's and the women's events took place at the NSW Tennis Centre in Sydney, Australia, from 9 through 17 January 2006.

Finals

Men's singles

 James Blake defeated  Igor Andreev, 6–2, 3–6, 7–6(7–3)

Women's singles

 Justine Henin-Hardenne defeated  Francesca Schiavone, 4–6, 7–5, 7–5

Men's doubles

 Fabrice Santoro /  Nenad Zimonjić defeated  František Čermák /  Leoš Friedl, 6–1, 6–4

Women's doubles

 Corina Morariu /  Rennae Stubbs defeated  Virginia Ruano Pascual /  Paola Suárez,  6–3, 5–7, 6–2

External links
Official website

 
Medibank International, 2006